
Kraśnik County is a unit of territorial administration and local government (powiat) in Lublin Voivodeship, eastern Poland. It was established on January 1, 1999, as a result of the Polish local government reforms passed in 1998.

As of 2019, its total population is 93,919, out of which the population of Kraśnik is 34,355, that of Annopol is 2,515, and the rural population is 57,049.

Neighbouring counties
Kraśnik County is bordered by Lublin County to the north-east, Janów Lubelski County and Stalowa Wola County to the south, Sandomierz County to the south-west, Opatów County to the west, and Opole Lubelskie County to the north-west.

Administrative division
The county is subdivided into 10 gminas (one urban, one urban-rural and eight rural). These are listed in the following table, in descending order of population.

External links
Official Kraśnik County website
Kraśnik County information in English
Kraśnik Internet Forum LKR.pl

References

 
Land counties of Lublin Voivodeship